Louise Walden (born 19 August 1983) is a British former competitive ice dancer. With Owen Edwards, she won gold at the 2010 Ice Challenge, 2010 International Trophy of Lyon, and 2011 British Championships. They competed in the final segment at two ISU Championships – 2011 Worlds, where they finished 20th, and 2012 Europeans, where they placed 13th.
Walden is a sports commentator for Eurosport and Discovery Plus, as well as an on and off ice skating coach and choreographer. She has also worked in professional shows.

Walden is a sports commentator for Eurosport and Discovery Plus, as well as an on and off ice skating coach and choreographer. She has also worked in professional shows.

Walden and Edwards married in May 2016 and live in the Lancashire, United Kingdom with their two sons, born 2018 and 2021.

Career 
Walden and Edwards began skating together in June 2006. They made their international debut in October 2008 at the 2008 Karl Schaefer Memorial in Vienna, Austria, where they placed 8th. Between April 2008 and September 2012, they were based at CSG Lyon International Skating Academy in France, where they were coached by Muriel Boucher-Zazoui, Romain Haguenauer and Olivier Schoenfelder. They won the British national title in the 2010–2011 season. At the 2011 World Championships in Moscow, they qualified to the final segment and finished 20th overall.

Walden/Edwards placed 13th at the 2012 European Championships in Sheffield, England. In September 2012, the duo moved to Hackensack, New Jersey, to train under Galit Chait. In May 2013, they took to their official website to announce their retirement from competitive skating.

Walden and Edwards were ranked fifth in the 2009/2010 UK national rankings and second in 2010/2011.

After retiring from competitive skating in 2013, Walden and Edwards turned professional, skating as principal performers in many ice shows. After this Louise continued to work professionally in Performance Management. 

In 2018 Walden began her commenting career for Eurosport and has covered many events such as the Winter Universiade, ISU Grand Prix Events, European Championships, World Championships, and the 2022 Winter Olympics.

Walden also works as an on and off ice figure skating coach and choreographer, based in the UK.

Programs 
(with Edwards)

Competitive highlights 
(with Edwards)

References 

 Nice October 2010
 Dortmund November 2010
 Graz November 2010
 Lyon November 2010

External links 

 
 
 Walden and Edwards: 2010–2011 Schedule

British female ice dancers
Living people
1983 births
Sportspeople from Preston, Lancashire
Competitors at the 2009 Winter Universiade
Competitors at the 2011 Winter Universiade